The Hôtel Martinez is a famous art deco style Grand Hotel on the Croisette at Cannes. It was opened on 20 February 1929 by its founder-owner Emmanuel Michele Martinez, son of the Baron Giovanni Martinez and Giuseppa Labiso Costanza, from Palermo Sicily, Italy, a noble ancient Italian family of Spanish origins. Karan Singh the crown prince of Jammu and Kashmir was born there in 1931.

History
In 1927, due to the enormous credit the patronymic "Martinez" obtained in the luxury hotels business around the world thanks to the expertise of Emmanuel Michele Martinez when he was Director Manager in Luxury Hotels in London and Paris, and at the time he was Director of the Cannes Luxury Hotel Association he decided to build his own Hotel Palace, at la Côte d'Azur, in the French Riviera, using the connections his family had with nobility, Mr. Martinez bought the "Villa Marie-Therese on September 22, 1927, from "His Royal Highness Alphonse de Bourbon. The Hotel Martinez opened in 1929. Emmanuel Michele Martinez named his Hotel after himself, his patronymic last name appears on giant blue neon lights on the top of the hotel at the center of the Croisette.

Karan Singh the crown prince of Jammu and Kashmir, and later a high ranking minister in the Government of India, was born at Suite 318-319-320 at the Martinez when his father Maharaja Hari Singh was holidaying there on March 9, 1931, and had reserved the entire third floor for the occasion.

During World War II, the Hôtel Martinez was occupied repeatedly: by the French Army, by the Italian Army, by the Commission d'armistice, by the German Army, and (after The Liberation) by the U.S.A. Air Force.

In 1981, the Hotel Martinez was sold to the Concorde Hotels & Resorts Group (belonging to the Taittinger Group).

In 2005, four iconic hotels including Hotel Martinez were sold to Starwood Capital Group.

The hotel was sold in 2012 and joined the Hyatt Group on April 9, 2013 and was renamed the Grand Hyatt Cannes Hotel Martinez. The hotel closed for renovations on October 30, 2017 and reopened for business on March 5, 2018 under its original name, as part of The Unbound Collection by Hyatt division. In June 2019, Yann Gillet was appointed General Manager of Hotel Martinez.  It celebrated its grand reopening on May 7, 2018. The renovations were made by the interior designer Pierre-Yves Rochon, the decor mix Art Deco style and modern luxury.

Location
Hotel Martinez is located on the Croisette at Cannes, 500 meters from the palais des Festivals, facing the Mediterranean Sea, the Bay of Cannes and the Lérins Islands.

Nice-Côte d’Azur International Airport is 45 minutes away by car.

Cannes train station is a 10 minutes’ walk.

Facilities
 409 rooms including 99 suites
 Restaurants : "La Palme d'Or" gourmet restaurant (two Michelin star restaurant), "Le Jardin du Martinez","La Plage du Martinez"
 Private beach : "La Plage du Martinez"
 Bars : "Martinez Bar" "La Plage du Martinez Bar"
 Kids Club
 2,500 sq.m. of conference space including : 15 versatile meeting rooms

References

External links 
  Hôtel Martinez (hotel website)
  La Palme d'Or (La Palme d'Or restaurant website)

1929 establishments in France
Hotels in Cannes
Buildings and structures in Cannes
Art Deco hotels
Art Deco architecture in France
Hotels established in 1929
Hyatt Hotels and Resorts
Hotel buildings completed in 1929